Alexander (Sasha) Berulava (11 November 1945 – 27 September 1993) was a Georgian journalist, writer, and human rights activist, founder of the Georgian Television of Abkhazia, who was murdered by Abkhaz separatists during the ethnic cleansing of Georgians in Abkhazia in 1993 together with other members of the Government of Abkhazia.

Alexander Berulava was born on 11 November 1945 in Sukhumi, Georgia. Berulava graduated from the Tbilisi State University, Faculty of Journalism.

Berulava joined the Council of Ministers and the Council of Self-Defense of Abkhazian Autonomous Republic during the Georgian-Abkhazian War in 1993 and served as the head of Military Press-Center. When the city of Sukhumi fell to the Abkhaz separatists on 27 September 1993, Berulava along with other authorities from the Government of Abkhazian Autonomous Republic (Zhiuli Shartava, Raul Eshba, Mamia Alasania, Guram Gabiskiria and others) refused to leave the besieged city and was captured by Abkhaz militants and North Caucasian volunteers.

Based on video materials, Human rights documents and witness accounts of the event, Berulava, Gabiskiria, Shartava, Eshba and other members of the government were dragged outside of the parliament building and forced to knee by the Abkhaz/North Caucasian militants. Berulava is not seen on the video, though according to the testimony of his friends, he refused to surrender and always kept a bullet and a F1 grenade in case of his capture (He was already captured by Abkhazian forces at the beginning of conflict and was tortured in Gudauta).

All captured members of the government including Berulava were murdered by the Abkhaz militants.

The President of Georgia Giorgi Margvelashvili awarded Alexander Berulava with the Vakhtang Gorgasali Order First grade order for his courage and heroism in the fight for the protection of the homeland and its territorial integrity.

References

External links 

 (right-click to open file)
Abkhazia.com web site
abkhazeti.ru Web Site
apsny.ge web site

1945 births
1993 deaths
People from Sukhumi
Mingrelians
20th-century politicians from Georgia (country)
Journalists from Georgia (country)
Tbilisi State University alumni
Abkhaz–Georgian conflict
1993 in Georgia (country)
Assassinated Abkhazian politicians
Ethnic cleansing of Georgians in Abkhazia
Abkhazian murder victims
Murder victims from Georgia (country)
Journalists killed in Georgia (country)
People murdered in Georgia (country)
20th-century journalists
1993 murders in Georgia (country)